Goree is a city in Knox County, Texas. The population was 203 at the 2010 census, down from 321 at the 2000 census. A July 1, 2013 U.S. Census Bureau estimate placed the population at 207.

Geography

Goree is located at  (33.468707, –99.523874). It is situated at the junction of U.S. Highway 277 and FM 266 in southeastern Knox County, approximately 84 miles north of Abilene.

History
Settlers first arrived in the area around 1886. By 1887, a settlement was centered around a store and post office built by Bill Benedict. Originally known as Riley Springs, the community was renamed Goree after Robert D. Goree, a Confederate veteran and Knox County pioneer. Benedict's store was bought by J.W. McLendon in 1890 and moved it with its post office to a new site that became known as North Goree. A school was built near the relocated store in 1901. In 1904, North Goree was renamed Hefner.

At its president-day location, the first plans for a new community began in 1905 with the announcement that the Wichita Valley Railroad would be built through the area. 1906 was an important year in Goree's history as the railroad arrived, homes and businesses were erected, and the community became an incorporated municipality. The school relocated from the Hefner location to Goree in 1906 as well and was renamed Chigger Hill School.

Goree had a population of 614 in 1920, but that figure had fallen to 425 by 1940. The number of residents rose to 640 in 1950, but declined throughout the remainder of the twentieth century.

Demographics

2020 census

As of the 2020 United States census, there were 158 people, 103 households, and 83 families residing in the city.

2000 census
As of the census of 2000, there were 321 people, 116 households, and 88 families residing in the city. The population density was 220.7 people per square mile (85.5/km2). There were 157 housing units at an average density of 107.9/sq mi (41.8/km2). The racial makeup of the city was 61.37% White, 8.10% African American, 3.74% Native American, 25.23% from other races, and 1.56% from two or more races. Hispanic or Latino of any race were 43.30% of the population.

There were 116 households, out of which 32.8% had children under the age of 18 living with them, 56.9% were married couples living together, 12.9% had a female householder with no husband present, and 24.1% were non-families. 21.6% of all households were made up of individuals, and 14.7% had someone living alone who was 65 years of age or older. The average household size was 2.77 and the average family size was 3.16.

In the city, the population was spread out, with 31.2% under the age of 18, 5.0% from 18 to 24, 24.9% from 25 to 44, 20.2% from 45 to 64, and 18.7% who were 65 years of age or older. The median age was 36 years. For every 100 females, there were 92.2 males. For every 100 females age 18 and over, there were 88.9 males.

The median income for a household in the city was $25,104, and the median income for a family was $25,556. Males had a median income of $19,063 versus $20,536 for females. The per capita income for the city was $13,169. About 24.4% of families and 31.8% of the population were below the poverty line, including 59.8% of those under age 18 and 10.1% of those age 65 or over.

Education
Munday Consolidated Independent School District operates public schools serving the community. The City of Goree was served by the Goree Independent School District until July 1, 2003, when it merged with the Munday Independent School District, forming the Munday CISD.

The school in Goree was used as the Munday Junior High, serving the district's seventh and eighth grade students until about 2009. It is now used as the Knox Prairie event center which hosts the Knox Prairie Quilt Show every February.

Bobby Boatright Memorial Music Camp

Goree is the site of the annual Bobby Boatright Memorial Music Camp, an event for aspiring Western Swing musicians of all ages to hone and showcase their musical talents.  The camp is named for the late Bobby Boatright, Western Swing musician, who was chief fiddle instructor before his death in 2008.  The camp was profiled in a story that aired on July 21, 2010 on National Public Radio's Morning Edition program.

References

External links
  About Goree, TX 
 Website for the City of Goree

Cities in Texas
Cities in Knox County, Texas